The 2006 Portland Grand Prix was the sixth race for the 2006 American Le Mans Series season at Portland International Raceway.  It took place on July 22, 2006.

Official results

Class winners in bold.  Cars failing to complete 70% of winner's distance marked as Not Classified (NC).

Statistics
 Pole Position - #16 Dyson Racing - 1:03.101
 Fastest Lap - #2 Audi Sport North America - 1:04.313
 Distance - 
 Average Speed -

External links
 

P
Portland Grand Prix
Port
Portland Grand Prix